Leptactina densiflora, also known as Leptactinia, is a shrub from central Africa, and can grow from 6 to 12 feet.  The plant is a psychedelic, containing tetrahydroharmine (also known as leptaflorin) which is a monoamine oxidase inhibitor.

References

densiflora
Flora of Africa